The Rural Municipality of Bengough No. 40 is a rural municipality (RM) in the Canadian province of Saskatchewan within Census Division No. 2 and  Division No. 2. It is located in the southeast portion of the province.

History 
The RM of Bengough No. 40 incorporated as a rural municipality on January 1, 1913.

Heritage properties
There are three historic properties within the RM.

Horizon Community Church Centre - Constructed in 1928, as the St. Cunegunda Roman Catholic Church in the then town of Horizon, Saskatchewan, approximately  thirty kilometres west of Ogema, Saskatchewan.
Horizon Federal Elevator - Constructed in 1922 in the town of Horizon, the grain elevator was in use until 1996 when the line was abandoned.  A group of local farmer purchased the line and grain elevator as part of the Red Coat Road and Rail Ltd.
Saskatchewan Wheat Pool Elevator - Constructed in 1953 in the town of Horizon, the grain elevator is still in use.

Geography

Communities and localities 
The following urban municipalities are surrounded by the RM.

Towns
 Bengough

The following unincorporated communities are located within the RM.

Localities
 Harptree
 Horizon, (dissolved as a village, December 31, 1973)
 Roncott
 Ritchie

Demographics 

Government 
The RM of Bengough No. 40 is governed by an elected municipal council and an appointed administrator that meets on the second Thursday of every month. The reeve of the RM is Eugene Hoffart while its administrator is Lara Hazen. The RM's office is located in Bengough.

References 

B
Division No. 2, Saskatchewan